NGC 3597 is a galaxy located approximately 150 million light-years away in the constellation of Crater. It was discovered by John Herschel on March 21, 1835.

Characteristics 

NGC 3597 is thought to be the product of the collision of two large galaxies, and it appears to be slowly evolving to become an elliptical galaxy. Because of this, NGC 3597 is interesting to astronomers. Galaxies smashing together pool their available gas and dust, triggering new rounds of star birth. Some of this material ends up in dense pockets initially called proto-globular clusters, dozens of which festoon NGC 3597. These pockets will go on to collapse and form globular clusters, packed tightly full of millions of stars.

See also 
 Interacting galaxy

References

External links 
 

Elliptical galaxies
Crater (constellation)
3597
034266